Piero Stivanello (born 26 March 1957 in Turin) is an Italian retired football player and manager. He was the son of former Juventus footballer Giorgio Stivanello and played as a midfielder. He played for Vicenza Calcio youth teams and made his debut on 26 January 1975 against Juventus. At the end of the season Lanerossi Vicenza relegated and the subsequent year he played two more matches with them in Serie B. He played also for Reggiana, Massese and Valdagno.
After his retiremt he became an amatorial manager. He coached Cavazzale and San Paolo in Eccellenza.

Career a player
1974-1976 L.R. Vicenza 3 (0)
1976-1977 Reggiana 6 (1)
1977-1978 L.R. Vicenza 0 (0)
1978-1979 Massese 22 (3)
1979-1981 Valdagno  ? (?)
????  Cittadella  ? (?)

Career as a coach
2005-2007 Cavazzale
2007- San Paolo

References

External links
 http://www.lastoriadellareggiana.it/Schede%20Giocatori/S/STIVANELLO.htm

1957 births
Living people
Italian footballers
L.R. Vicenza players
Italian football managers

Association football midfielders